Josanne Potter (born 13 November 1984) is an English former footballer who played as a midfielder, most recently for Reading. Originally a left-winger, she matured into a creative central midfield player. At club level Potter enjoyed three separate spells at Birmingham City Ladies and was noted for her crossing abilities and goalscoring record. She played in three FA Women's Cup finals – with Arsenal in 2004, Charlton Athletic in 2007 and Birmingham City in 2012. On the international stage, she often had to compete with Rachel Yankey and Sue Smith for a place on the left flank of the England team. After 2007 Potter worked as a BBC television football pundit.

Club career
While attending The Manor School, Potter began her career at Chesterfield centre of excellence. She was with Sheffield Wednesday in 2001–2002, before signing for Birmingham City.

By 2004 she was playing for Arsenal then signed for Charlton Athletic in summer 2005. When Charlton ditched their ladies team in 2007, Potter moved on to Everton, then returned to Birmingham City in January 2009.

With Birmingham not playing until the FA Women's Super League in March 2011, Potter signed a short-term deal with Leicester City in summer 2010.

In May 2013 Potter's excellent form with Birmingham, playing in a central midfield role, led to manager David Parker demanding that she be given another chance at international level. In June 2016, Potter and teammate Jade Moore both bought out the last six months of their Birmingham City contracts and left the club as free agents. Despite the players' long service, a statement on Birmingham City Ladies' website called the development "an excellent deal for the club".

Later that month Potter and Moore joined Notts County on short-term deals until the end of the 2016 FA WSL season. Less than a year later, however, the club folded before the 2017 FA WSL Spring Series. Becoming a free agent, Potter joined Reading along with teammates Jade Moore and Kirsty Linnett in May 2017. On 8 June 2020, Reading announced that Potter had left the club after her contract had expired.

She announced her retirement from football in January 2021.

International career
Potter played for England at U16 level. She helped England U19s qualify for the 2003 UEFA Women's Under-19 Championship finals, scoring twice in 90 seconds against Bulgaria on 4 October 2002.

She was called up to the senior team for the first time for a friendly against Nigeria in April 2004, while playing for Arsenal. But she had to pull out due to a back injury. In September 2004 she featured as a substitute in two friendlies against the Netherlands.

Potter narrowly missed out on selection for UEFA Women's Euro 2005, but was recalled straight after the tournament following impressive performances for the U21 team. She scored against Hungary during England's record 13–0 win in October 2005. Potter withdrew from the World Cup qualifying play-off against France in September 2006 with damaged ankle ligaments. However, she returned to the team for the 1–0 friendly win over Scotland in March 2007.

After a seven-year absence from the England team, Potter was recalled by coach Mark Sampson for a friendly with Sweden in August 2014. She scored her second goal for England in September 2014, during a 10–0 win in Montenegro. In May 2015, Sampson named Potter in his final squad for the 2015 FIFA Women's World Cup, where the team finished a historic third. Potter was named to her second consecutive major tournament finals squad when Sampson selected her to his UEFA Women's Euro 2017 squad in April 2017.

International goals
Scores and results list England's goal tally first.

Media career
After missing out on a place in the FIFA Women's World Cup 2007 squad, Potter worked for the BBC as an expert analyst in their tournament coverage. She continued to work for the BBC on their women's football coverage.

Potter also worked as a Football Association skills coach, based in Sheffield. In 2015 Potter was employed by teammate Jade Moore, who had her own sports therapy business.

Honours

Club
Birmingham City
FA Women's Cup (1): 2011–12

International
England
FIFA Women's World Cup third place: 2015

References

External links

Profile at the Football Association website

1984 births
Living people
English women's footballers
Everton F.C. (women) players
Arsenal W.F.C. players
Charlton Athletic W.F.C. players
Birmingham City W.F.C. players
Notts County L.F.C. players
England women's international footballers
FA Women's National League players
Women's Super League players
English association football commentators
England women's under-23 international footballers
2015 FIFA Women's World Cup players
Footballers from Mansfield
Women's association football midfielders
Reading F.C. Women players
Leicester City W.F.C. players
UEFA Women's Euro 2017 players